Jan-Marco Montag (born 12 August 1983 in Cologne) is a German field hockey player. He was a member of the Men's National Teams that won the gold medal at the 2008 Summer Olympics and at the 2006 World Cup.

External links
 
Athlete biography at 2008 Olympics official website

1983 births
Living people
German male field hockey players
Field hockey players at the 2008 Summer Olympics
Olympic field hockey players of Germany
Olympic gold medalists for Germany
Olympic medalists in field hockey
Medalists at the 2008 Summer Olympics
Sportspeople from Cologne
2010 Men's Hockey World Cup players
21st-century German people